Baloney is another name for bologna sausage.

Baloney may also refer to:

 Baloney (Animaniacs), a character from Animaniacs
 Baloney (album), an EP by LA Symphony
 Baloney (Henry P.), a children's picture book by Jon Scieszka and Lane Smith
 American slang term for something that doesn't make sense or fit the evidence; see Nonsense

See also
 Bologna (disambiguation)
 Bologne (disambiguation)